The 2023 Africa U-20 Cup of Nations qualification was a men's under-20 football competition which decided the participating teams of the 2023 Africa U-20 Cup of Nations.

Players born 1 January 2003 or later were eligible to participate in the competition. A total of twelve teams qualified to play in the final tournament, including Egypt who qualified automatically as hosts.

Teams

Notes
Teams in bold qualified for the final tournament.
(H): Qualifying tournament hosts
(Q): Automatically qualified for final tournament regardless of qualification results
(W): Withdrew

Schedule
The qualifying competition was split into regional competitions, with the teams entering the qualifying tournament of their zone. The schedule of each qualifying zone was as follows.

North Zone

The 2022 UNAF U-20 Tournament, which also served as the qualifiers for the Africa U-20 Cup of Nations, took place between 18 to 24 October 2022 in Suez, Egypt. The draw for the fixtures was held on 20 July 2022. The four teams were placed in one group, with the winner qualifying for the final tournament.

All times are local, EGY (UTC+2).

<onlyinclude>

West A Zone
The WAFU-UFOA Zone A qualifiers for the Africa U-20 Cup of Nations were hosted by Mauritania with the matches played between 28 August–11 September 2022. The matches were played at Nouakchott, Mauritania.

All times are local, GMT (UTC+0).

Group stage
The seven teams were drawn into two groups of four and five teams. The winners and the runners-up of each group advanced to the semi-finals.
Group A

Group B

Knockout stage
Winners qualified for 2023 Africa U-20 Cup of Nations.

Semi-finals

Final

West B Zone
The WAFU-UFOA Zone B qualifiers for the Africa U-20 Cup of Nations were hosted by Niger with the matches played between 7–20 May 2022. The draw was   announced on 15 April 2022.

All times are local, WAT (UTC+1).

Group stage
The seven teams were drawn into two groups of three and four teams. The winners and the runners-up of each group advanced to the semi-finals.

Group A

Group B

Knockout stage

Semi-finals
Winners qualified for 2023 Africa U-20 Cup of Nations.

Third place

Final

Central Zone
The UNIFFAC qualifiers for the Africa U-20 Cup of Nations were held in Congo between 8–14 December 2022.

The seven participating teams were drawn into two groups of four and three teams, with Congo, DR Congo, the Central African Republic and Sao Tome and Principe drawn in Group A; and Cameroon, Chad and Equatorial Guinea drawn into Group B. However on 25 November, Sao Tome & Principe withdrew from the competition, with Chad and Equatorial Guinea following suit.

The four remaining teams were then placed in one group with the winners and the runners-up qualifying for the final tournament.

All times are local, WAT (UTC+1).

Central-East Zone

The CECAFA qualifiers for the Africa U-20 Cup of Nations were hosted by Sudan between 28 October and 11 November 2022. The draw for the fixtures was held on 11 October 2022.

All times are local, CAT (UTC+2).

Group stage
The seven teams were drawn into two groups of three and four teams. The winners and the runners-up of each group advanced to the semi-finals.

Group A

Group B

Knockout stage

Semi-finals
Winners qualified for 2023 Africa U-20 Cup of Nations.

Third place

Final

South Zone

The COSAFA qualifiers for the Africa U-20 Cup of Nations were hosted by Eswatini between 7–16 October 2022.

All times are local, SAST (UTC+2).

Group stage
The twelve teams were drawn into three groups of four teams. The winners from each group and the best runners-up advanced to the semi-finals.

Group A

Group B

Group C

Ranking of second-placed teams

Knockout stage
Winners qualified for 2023 Africa U-20 Cup of Nations.

Semi-finals

Third place

Final

Qualified teams
The following 12 teams qualify for the final tournament.

1 Bold indicates champions for that year. Italic indicates hosts for that year.

Goalscorers

See also 
 2023 Africa U-17 Cup of Nations qualification

Notes

References

U-20 Championship qualification
Africa U-20 Cup of Nations qualification
Qualification
2023